Kulti is a neighbourhood in Asansol. Asansol is located in Paschim Bardhaman district in the Indian state of West Bengal. It is governed by Asansol Municipal Corporation.

Geography
Kulti is located at latitude 23°43'60N and longitude 86°50'60E at an elevation of 114 meters.

As per the 2011 census, 83.33% of the population of Asansol Sadar subdivision was urban and 16.67% was rural. Asansol Sadar subdivision has 26 (+1 partly) Census Towns.(partly presented in the map alongside; all places marked on the map are linked in the full-screen map).

Administration
As per orders of the Delimitation Commission, 282 Kulti assembly constituency covers Kulti municipality. Kulti assembly segment is part of Asansol (Lok Sabha constituency). Ujjal Chatterjee of Trinamool Congress won the Kulti assembly seat in 2006. Maniklal Acharya of Forward Bloc had won the seat in 2001. Prior to that the seat was won by Maniklal Acharjee of Forward Bloc in 1996 and 1991, Tuhin Samanta of Congress in 1987, Madhu Banerjee of Forward Bloc in 1982 and 1977. Ramdas Banerjee of Congress won in 1972 and 1971, Dr. Taraknath Chakrabarti of Samyukta Socialist Party won in 1969, Dr. Jai Narayan Sharma of Congress in 1967 and 1962, Benarasi Prasad Jha of PSP in 1957. In 1952, independent India's first election, Kulti was a twin member constituency, and those elected were Jai Narayan Sharma and Baidyanath Mondal, both of Congress.

Kulti police station has jurisdiction over parts of Asansol Municipal Corporation. The area covered is 96 km2 and the population covered is 310,000.

Demographics
As per the 2011 Census of India Kulti municipal area had a total population of 313,809, of which 163,193 (52%) were males and 150,616 (48%) were females. Population below 6 years was 35,385. The total number of literates in Kulti was 209,952 (88.72% of the population over 6 years).

 India census, Kulti had a population of 290,057. Males constitute 53% of the population and females 47%. Kulti has an average literacy rate of 62%, higher than the national average of 59.5%: male literacy is 70%, and female literacy is 52%. In Kulti, 12% of the population is under 6 years of age. According to the census, 19% of the population in Kulti is Muslim, 70% Hindu. Other minorities such as Christian, Sikhs, Buddhist and Jain constitute the rest of the city's population

See also
 Paschim Bardhaman district
 IISCO Steel Plant

References
 History of The Indian Iron and Steel Co. Ltd. by Dr. N.R.Srinivasan

Notes

Neighbourhoods in Asansol